Mario Ghedina (born 1909, date of death unknown) was an Italian architect. His work was part of the architecture event in the art competition at the 1948 Summer Olympics.

References

1909 births
Year of death unknown
20th-century Italian architects
Olympic competitors in art competitions
People from Cortina d'Ampezzo